Yaneth Viveros Campos (born 21 January 1993) is a Bolivian footballer who plays as a midfielder. She has been a member of the Bolivia women's national team.

International career
Viveros played for Bolivia at senior level in a 0–6 friendly loss to Brazil on 9 April 2017.

References

1993 births
Living people
Women's association football midfielders
Women's association football defenders
Bolivian women's footballers
Bolivia women's international footballers